Stephen Sucic (April 21, 1921 – June 29, 2001) was an American football player and coach.

References

External links
 

1921 births
2001 deaths
American football halfbacks
Boston Yanks players
Bradley Braves football coaches
Detroit Lions players
Illinois Fighting Illini football coaches
Illinois Fighting Illini football players
Kansas State Wildcats football coaches
Los Angeles Rams players
Sportspeople from Chicago
Coaches of American football from Illinois
Players of American football from Chicago